Jordão, the Portuguese equivalent to Jordan (name) may refer to:

People 
Aida Jordão, Portuguese-Canadian playwright
Rui Jordão (1952–2019), Angola-born Portuguese international footballer
Jordão (footballer born 1971), Adelino José Martins Batista, Angolan-Portuguese footballer
Jordão Diogo (born 1985), footballer from Portugal who plays for Panserraikos on loan from KR Reykjavík
Francisco Jordão (born 1979), Portuguese basketball player
Jordao Pattinama (born 1989), Dutch footballer

Place 
Jordão, Acre
Campos do Jordão
Foz do Jordão
Jordão River (disambiguation)